Reyes de la noche is a Spanish comedy-drama television series centered on the world of sports radio broadcasting. Created by Adolfo Valor and Cristóbal Garrido and starring Javier Gutiérrez, Miki Esparbé and Itsaso Arana, its single season aired on Movistar+ in May 2021.

Premise 
The series is set in between the 1980s and the 1990s during the golden age of Spanish sports radio broadcasting.

Paco el Cóndor, the biggest radio personality in Spain, leaves his radio station as he signs up for a competitor. His aggressive style attracts the attention from the radio listeners. His second in command and pupil, the younger Jota, stays and becomes his rival as they vie for hegemony in the radio system. While Jota initially disapproves of El Cóndor's methods, he learns the hard way that if he is to succeed, he will need to follow his former master's steps. Meanwhile, the radio programme hosted by Marga Laforet is moved to the early morning slot.

Cast

Production and release 
Created by Adolfo Valor and Cristóbal Garrido, Reyes de la noche is produced by Movistar+ in collaboration with Zeta Studios. The series consists of 6 episodes featuring a running time of around 30 minutes. The filming started in July 2020, and it was wrapped by September 2020. On 14 April 2021, Movistar+ disclosed the release date of 14 May 2021 for the first 2 episodes.

The series was cancelled after one season.

Awards and nominations 

|-
| align = "center" rowspan = "4" | 2021 || 27th Forqué Awards || Best Actor (TV series) || Javier Gutiérrez ||  || 
|-
| rowspan="3" | 9th MiM Series Awards || colspan ="2" | Best Miniseries ||  || rowspan="3" | 
|-
| Best Screenplay || Cristóbal Garrido & Adolfo Valor || 
|-
| Best Comedy Actor || Miki Esparbé || 
|-
| align ="center" rowspan ="4" | 2022 || rowspan ="4"| 9th Feroz Awards || colspan ="2" | Best Comedy Series ||  || rowspan="4" | 
|-
| Best Leading Actor (TV series) || Javier Gutiérrez || 
|-
| Best Supporting Actress (TV series) || Itsaso Arana || 
|-
| Best Supporting Actor (TV series) || Alberto San Juan || 
|}

References 

Movistar+ network series
2021 Spanish television series debuts
2021 Spanish television series endings
Spanish comedy-drama television series
Spanish-language television shows
Television shows set in Spain
Workplace drama television series
Workplace comedy television series
2020s Spanish comedy television series
2020s Spanish drama television series
2020s comedy-drama television series
2020s workplace comedy television series
2020s workplace drama television series
Television series by Zeta Studios